Enrico Reycend (Turin, Kingdom of Sardinia, November 3, 1855 – Turin, Kingdom of Italy, February 21, 1928) was an Italian painter, mainly of landscapes and vedute.

Biography
He attended the Accademia Albertina under Lorenzo Delleani and Antonio Fontanesi. He traveled to Paris a few times, and was influenced by the circle of Camille Corot. In 1877 at Naples, he exhibited: In Piemonte; in 1880 at Turin, La quiete; Natura mesta; in 1881 at Milan, he sent: In Ottobre; Sul Canavese; Rive del Pò; in 1883 at Milan, Ritorno dal Pascolo; Lungo il Pò a Turin; in 1883 to Rome, Dintorni di Torino; and finally in 1884 also to Rome, Il Barchetta; Ultime foglie and other landscapes painted al vero.

In 1885, he sent to Milan and Venice: In Ottobre; Greek temple nel Porto dì Genoa. In 1886 at Milan, he displayed: Giornata triste; Studi dal vero; Notte d'autunno. At the 1887 Mostra of Venice he sent: Pomeriggio; Studi dal vero; Fine d'agosto: The Port of Genoa: in 1888 to Bologna: Mattino tra i monti; Rain in the Port of Genoa; Scalo di Ferrovia a Turin; Settembre in montagna; and Sole velato; and finally in 1889 to Florence, he sent: Tra i monti.

Reycend, along with Davide Calandra, Leonardo Bistolfi, Giorgio Ceragioli and Enrico Thovez founded in 1902 the journal, L’arte decorativa moderna .

References

19th-century Italian painters
Italian male painters
20th-century Italian painters
1855 births
1928 deaths
Painters from Turin
Italian landscape painters
Accademia Albertina alumni
19th-century Italian male artists
20th-century Italian male artists